Thor Görans was a dansband in Örnsköldsvik, Sweden, established 1976 and disestablished following the final gig in  Lycksele, Sweden 8 April 2006.

Discography

Albums
Studio
Svunna tiders lycka - 1982
Glöm ej bort det finns rosor - 1984
Lyckans dag - 1989
Känslor mellan två - 1990
Judy - 1992
Ta mig hem - 1996
En på miljonen - 2000
Ändrade planer - 2003
Lika barn leka bäst - 2016

Compilations
40 År på Vägarna 1975-2015 - 2015

Album contribution
Soundtrack: Black Jack - 1990

Svensktoppen hit songs
I mitt innersta hjärta - 1993
Att älska så här - 1996
Ingen som du - 1997
Att älska så här - 1996
En vän för livet - 1998-1999
Små ögonblick - 1999
Ett hjärta som älskar - 1999
Säg att du längtar - 2000
När alla gått hem - 2002

Non-charting
Älskar du mej - 1998
En på miljonen - 2000
Med fötterna på jorden - 2001

References

1976 establishments in Sweden
2006 disestablishments in Sweden
Dansbands
Musical groups established in 1976
Musical groups disestablished in 2006
Swedish musical groups